The 1909 Swarthmore Quakers football team was an American football team that represented Swarthmore College as an independent during the 1909 college football season. The team compiled a 2–5 record and was outscored by a total of 101 to 84. George H. Brooke was the head coach.

Schedule

References

Swarthmore
Swarthmore Garnet Tide football seasons
Swarthmore Quakers football